National Route 269 is a national highway of Japan connecting Ibusuki, Kagoshima and Miyazaki, Miyazaki in Japan, with a total length of 147.4 km (91.59 mi).

References

269
Roads in Kagoshima Prefecture
Roads in Miyazaki Prefecture